First Interstate Arena (colloquially known as The Metra) is a multi-purpose arena located at MetraPark, the fairgrounds of Billings, Montana. The arena has a capacity of 8,700 for ice hockey and indoor football games, 10,500 for basketball, and up to 12,000 for concerts.  The arena hosts a variety of local sporting, musical, and other events. It has also hosted professional sporting competitions. In 2005, MetraPark Arena marked its 30th anniversary. The arena was renovated in 2010 and 2011 at a cost of $27 million.

History

The arena was completed in 1975 and named the METRA, an acronym that stood for Montana Entertainment Trade and Recreation Arena. It was built at the Midland Empire Fairgrounds, which later was renamed MetraPark, at which time the arena became MetraPark Arena. The naming rights were sold to Billings-based Rimrock Auto Group in 2007 and the arena went by the name Rimrock Auto Arena at MetraPark. It is owned by Yellowstone County. On June 20, 2010, the Father's Day Tornado hit the arena, causing major damage In 2010–2011 the arena was remodeled, resulting in many new amenities such as improved acoustics, more restrooms and concession areas, and easier access from the parking areas. The arena is an energy efficient building with contemporary aesthetics. On April 10, 2011, with the outer arena still under construction, Elton John played the first concert in the Arena since the tornado.

Name changes 
On February 21, 2007, Rimrock Auto Group announced a 10-year, US $1 million naming rights deal for the arena.  Beginning July 1, 2007 it became known as the Rimrock Auto Arena at MetraPark. On June 3, 2019, First Interstate Bank announced a 5-year US$875,000 naming rights deal for the arena. The new name of the facility would be First Interstate Arena at MetraPark.

Events

Concerts 
The Arena remains the largest indoor concert venue in Montana and hosts an average of 9–12 concerts each year. In 2015, The Eagles set a record for the largest grossing concert at the venue, grossing $1.4 million in tickets sold.

Other major concert performances  at the arena included Aerosmith, Beach Boys, Black Sabbath, Garth Brooks, Johnny Cash, Cher, Def Leppard, John Denver, Neil Diamond, Elton John, Fleetwood Mac, Foo Fighters, Foreigner, Merle Haggard, Jethro Tull, Lynyrd Skynyrd, Tim McGraw, Metallica, Mötley Crüe, Willie Nelson, Nickelback, Rush, Bob Seger, Slayer, George Strait, Styx, Carrie Underwood, Van Halen, and ZZ Top.

Annual 
Montana State High School Wrestling Tournament – February
M.A.T.E (Montana Agri-Trade Expo) – February
Spring Home Improvement Show – March
MontanaFair – August
Fall Home Improvement Show – September
NILE (Northern International Livestock Exposition) Stock Show and Rodeo – October 
Chase Hawks Memorial Rough Stock Rodeo – December
Every other year MetraPark host a Men's college basketball game between Montana State and Wyoming.

Sporting 

The Arena has been home to two teams with the Indoor Football League IFL. The Billings Outlaws played in the league from 2000 to 2010 before disbanding following the June 2010 Father's Day tornado. In 2015, the league expanded adding the Billings Wolves but only lasted two seasons before folding as well.

MetraPark has hosted pre-season NBA games on a semi-regular basis. The Arena played host to the first ever game for the NBA's Oklahoma City Thunder on October 8, 2008 in a pre-season game against the Timberwolves. The Timberwolves prevailed 88–82.

MetraPark is a longtime tour stop for the PBR's Built Ford Tough Series (known as the Bud Light Cup until 2003), which has visited the arena every year since 1996.

In the summer of 2005, MetraPark hosted tryouts for the All-American Professional Basketball League (AAPBL), a new minor basketball league. The tryouts took place from July 11 to 22, 2005. However, the league folded shortly thereafter.

MetraPark has also played host to various WWE, WCW and UWF wrestling events including a live televised WCW Monday Nitro television show on June 19, 2000.

In 2017, First Interstate Arena hosted the NAIA Women's DI Basketball Tournament.

U.S. presidential visits 
Donald Trump – 2018
George W. Bush – 2001 and 2006
Bill Clinton – 1996
George H. W. Bush – 1992
Ronald Reagan – 1982
John F. Kennedy – 1963 Kennedy spoke at MetraPark, then known as the Midland Empire Fairgrounds. This occurred prior to the construction of the current arena.

References

External links 
Official website

Indoor ice hockey venues in Montana
Sports venues in Billings, Montana
Western Hockey League arenas
Convention centers in Montana
Billings Wolves
Continental Basketball Association venues
Indoor arenas in Montana
Basketball venues in Montana
Sports venues completed in 1975
1975 establishments in Montana